Peter J. O'Brien (June 17, 1877 – January 31, 1917) was a Major League Baseball second baseman who played for three seasons. He played for the Cincinnati Reds in 1901, the St. Louis Browns in 1906, and the Cleveland Naps and Washington Senators in 1907.

External links

1877 births
1917 deaths
Major League Baseball second basemen
Cincinnati Reds players
St. Louis Browns players
Cleveland Naps players
Washington Senators (1901–1960) players
Baseball players from New York (state)
Rome Romans players
Binghamton Bingos players
Cortland Wagonmakers players
Utica Pentups players
Waverly Wagonmakers players
Indianapolis Indians players
St. Paul Saints (AA) players
Minneapolis Millers (baseball) players
Evansville Strikers players
South Bend Bux players
Atlanta Crackers players
Mobile Sea Gulls players